The Little River (also called Little Creek) is a river, approximately  long, in central Delaware in the United States.

The lower  of the river is surrounded by extensive wetlands protected as part of the Little Creek Wildlife Area.

See also
List of Delaware rivers

References

Rivers of Delaware
Rivers of Kent County, Delaware
Tributaries of Delaware Bay